Boriavi, also spelled Boriyavi, is a village in Mehsana Taluka of Mahesana district in Gujarat, India.

Economy
The cattle feed factory Sagardan owned by Dudhsagar Dairy is located in the village.

Amentites
The village has a primary school and waterworks.

References

Villages in Mehsana district